William and Victoria Pulver House is a historic home located at Snyderville in Columbia County, New York.  It was built about 1875 and is a two-story, square plan wood-frame building with a hipped roof topped by a square cupola.  It has two, one story hipped roof wings. Also on the property is a shed and garage.

It was added to the National Register of Historic Places in 2005.

References

Houses on the National Register of Historic Places in New York (state)
Italianate architecture in New York (state)
Houses completed in 1875
Houses in Columbia County, New York
National Register of Historic Places in Columbia County, New York